Land Force Western Area (LFWA) was a formation of the Canadian Army responsible for operations in the Canadian provinces of Manitoba, Saskatchewan, Alberta and British Columbia. LFWA was headquartered at CFB Edmonton.  The command was formed in 1991. In 2013 it was announced that LFWA would be renamed 3rd Canadian Division. This change took place in the summer of 2014.

History
LFWA was created on 1 September 1991, taking command of what was previously Prairie Militia Area, Pacific Militia Area, and the Regular Force Army units and formations in western Canada from the northern lakehead region of Ontario to the Pacific Ocean.  At that point in time, the Militia Areas ceased to exist, and the seven subordinate Militia Districts were reorganised into four: British Columbia District, Alberta District, Saskatchewan District, and Manitoba-Lakehead District.

Later that decade, the four reserve force districts were again reorganized into three Canadian Brigade Groups.

In 2014 LFWA was renamed 3rd Canadian Division.  With this change of name, the formation was also granted the identifying patch and historical lineage to the division that fought in the two world wars.

Commanders
Major-General T.F. de Faye (1991–93)
Brigadier-General Beare, CD (2004–2005)
Brigadier-General Jorgensen, OMM, MSM, CD (2008 −2010)
Brigadier-General P.F. Wynnyk, OMM, CD (2010–2012)
Brigadier-General J.C.G. Juneau (2012–2014)

Units
Land Force Western Area had four brigade groups (one Regular Force and three Reserve Force), and an Area Support Group.

There were also five units are under direct command of LFWA that did not operate under the brigade or area support groups. They were:
 Land Force Western Area Headquarters – (CFB Edmonton)
 6 Intelligence Company
 1 Area Construction Troop, 4 Engineer Support Regiment – (CFB Edmonton)
 4th Canadian Ranger Patrol Group – (Group HQ in Victoria, BC. Ranger Company HQs in Victoria, Edmonton and Winnipeg, plus Junior Canadian Ranger Company HQ also in Victoria. 42 Canadian Ranger Patrols (platoon size) across the four western provinces)
 Land Force Western Area Training Centre – (CFB Wainwright)

The LFWA maintained an official military band until 1998.

1 Canadian Mechanized Brigade Group
1 Canadian Mechanized Brigade Group was a Regular Force brigade group based out of CFB Edmonton.

1 Area Support Group
1 Area Support Group was headquartered out of CFB Edmonton. The Support Group was responsible for providing service and support to the units of Land Force Western Area.

38 Canadian Brigade Group
38 Canadian Brigade Group (38 CBG) was a Reserve Force brigade group based out of Winnipeg, Manitoba. It's composed of units in Saskatchewan, Manitoba and eastwards into Ontario to Thunder Bay, Ontario.

39 Canadian Brigade Group
39 Canadian Brigade Group (39 CBG) was a Primary Reserve brigade group based out of Vancouver, British Columbia. All of the units of the brigade are from the province of British Columbia.

41 Canadian Brigade Group
41 Canadian Brigade Group (41 CBG) was a Reserve Force brigade group based out of Calgary, Alberta. The units forming the brigade group are from the province of Alberta, as well as a company based out of Yellowknife, Northwest Territories.

Museums

Acronyms

 ASU: Area Support Unit
 CFB: Canadian Forces Base
 RCA: The Royal Regiment of Canadian Artillery
 RCAC: Royal Canadian Armoured Corps

References

Divisions of Canada
Western
Military units and formations established in 1991
1991 establishments in Canada